"Run for Your Life" is a song recorded by Swedish singer Måns Zelmerlöw. It was released on 14 January 2014 as a digital download in Sweden. It was released as the third single from his fifth studio album Barcelona Sessions (2014). The song was written by Zelmerlöw, Gavin Jones and Robert Habolin, who also produced the song.

Live performances
Zelmerlöw has performed the song live on Musikhjälpen and Nyhetsmorgon.

Music video
A music video to accompany the release of "Run for Your Life" was first released onto YouTube on 17 January 2014 at a total length of three minutes and forty-one seconds. The video was directed by Robin Ehlde.

Track listing

Release history

References

2013 songs
Måns Zelmerlöw songs
Songs written by Måns Zelmerlöw
Songs written by Robert Habolin
Warner Music Group singles
English-language Swedish songs